Dorothy Malone (born 1901, date of death unknown) was an American writer and columnist. Her books include How Mama Could Cook! (1946), Cookbook for Brides (1947) and Cookbook for Beginners (1953). Malone wrote a daily column under the pen name Prudence Penny for the New York American and later wrote as "Elsie Barton" for Secrets magazine.

According to a 1947 profile, Malone worked for William Randolph Hearst's company (now Hearst Communications) for 15 years.

As of 1947, she had a weekly radio program on a station called WOR (possibly either WEPN-FM or WOR).

References

External links

1901 births
Year of death missing
American cookbook writers
20th-century American women writers
20th-century American non-fiction writers
American women non-fiction writers
Pseudonymous women writers
20th-century pseudonymous writers